The Boston Latin School is a public exam school in Boston, Massachusetts. It was established on April 23, 1635, making it both the oldest public school in the British America and the oldest existing school in the United States. Its curriculum follows that of the 18th century Latin school movement, which holds the classics to be the basis of an educated mind. Four years of Latin are mandatory for all students who enter the school in the 7th grade, three years for those who enter in the 9th grade.

History

Boston Latin School was founded on April 23, 1635 by the Town of Boston. The school was modeled after the Free Grammar School of Boston in England under the influence of Reverend John Cotton. The first classes were held in the home of the Master, Philemon Pormort.  John Hull was the first student to graduate (1637). It was intended to educate young men of all social classes in the classics. The school was initially funded by donations and land rentals rather than by taxes.  A school established in nearby Dedham was the first tax-supported public school.

Latin is the mother of modern Romance languages and was an educational priority in the 17th century.  The ability to read at least Cicero and Virgil was a requirement of all colonial colleges, and to write and speak Latin in verse and prose was the first of the “Harvard College Laws” of 1642.  Boston Latin prepared many students for admission to Harvard, with a total of seven years devoted to the classics.  However, most graduates of Boston Latin did not go on to college, since business and professions did not require college training.

A cadet corps was founded during the American Civil War, and was disbanded in the early 1960s.

Boston Latin has produced four Harvard University presidents, four Massachusetts governors, and five signers of the United States Declaration of Independence. Benjamin Franklin and Louis Farrakhan are among its well-known dropouts.

Until the 19th century, the Latin School admitted only male students and hired only male teachers. Helen Magill White was the school's first female graduate and the first American woman to earn a doctorate. Magill White was the only female pupil at the school when she attended. Later, the Girls' Latin School was founded in 1877. Boston Latin admitted its first co-educational class in 1972.

The school appointed Marie Frisardi Cleary and Juanita Ponte as the first two women in its academic faculty in 1967. Cornelia Kelley was the school's first female headmaster, serving from 1998 until her retirement in 2007, after which Lynne Mooney Teta became headmaster. In 2016, Mooney Teta resigned amid a federal probe into racially charged incidents at the school. In 2017, Rachel Skerritt became the first person of color to serve as headmaster. Skerritt resigned at the conclusion of the 2021-22 school school year and was succeeded in the retitled position of Head of School by elementary principal and fellow Latin School alumnus Jason Gallagher.

Location history

Academics
Boston Latin's motto is Sumus Primi, Latin for we are first. This is a double entendre, referring both to the school's date of founding and its academic stature. Boston Latin has a history of pursuing the same standards as elite New England prep schools while adopting the egalitarian attitude of a public school. Academically, the school regularly outperforms public schools in affluent Boston suburbs, particularly as measured by the yearly MCAS assessment required of all Massachusetts public schools. In 2006, Brooklyn Latin School was founded in New York City, explicitly modeled on Boston Latin, borrowing much from its traditions and curriculum.  In 2006, Washington Latin School was founded in Washington DC, also modeled on Boston Latin.

Admissions
Until 2020, admission to Boston Latin School was determined by a combination of a student's score on the Independent School Entrance Examination (ISEE) and recent grades, and is limited to residents of the city of Boston. As a result of the COVID-19 pandemic, however, the entrance exam has been suspended, and admission is based on grades and Boston residency.

Although Boston Latin runs from the 7th through the 12th grade, it admits students only into the 7th and 9th grades.

The school has been the subject of controversy concerning its admissions process. Before the 1997 school year, Boston Latin set aside a 35% quota of places in the incoming class for under-represented minorities. The school was forced to drop this policy after a series of lawsuits were brought by white females who were not admitted despite ranking higher (based on test scores and GPA) than admitted minorities.

After the lawsuits, the percentage of under-represented minorities at Boston Latin fell from 35% in 1997 to under 19% in 2005, despite efforts by Boston Latin, the Boston Public Schools, and the Boston Latin School Association to recruit more minority applicants and retain more minority students.

Boston Latin later defeated a legal effort to end its admissions process entirely in favor of admissions by blind lottery.

In recent years, the admissions exam has continued to cause controversy due to the lack of diversity among admitted students. In 2017, Lawyers for Civil Rights published the demographics of the incoming class, highlighting that Black students are invited to attend Boston Latin at a rate that is more than two and a half times lower than their enrollment rates in Boston Public Schools overall.

The following year in 2018, Harvard Kennedy School released a brief explaining possible reasons for the racial gap in Boston Latin School’s admissions. Among the reasons are the lower rates of participation in the ISEE by Black and Hispanic students, lower ISEE scores due to inequitable curriculum and resources in the schools from which these students come, reported GPA differences, and less likelihood of Black and Hispanic students to list Boston Latin School as their top choice in school placement forms.

In 2019, Lawyers for Civil Rights, alongside the Boston chapter of the NAACP, sent a letter to Mayor Walsh, the Boston School Committee, and the superintendent, seeking to redo the admissions policies for Boston Latin School. The organizations cited the disproportionate admission rates of Black and Hispanic students versus white students as a failure of the exam system, and asked for a process that would diversify the school and take into account a student's personal achievements.

The Educational Records Bureau (ERB), the organization responsible for creating and updating the ISEE, reportedly decided to end its yearly contract with the Boston Public Schools (BPS) in April 2019. In an email sent to the school district and other clients, ERB claimed that the test’s scoring metric had been incorrectly applied by BPS, resulting in underrepresented race groups failing to be admitted. BPS, however, denied that ERB cut business ties with the school district. BPS claimed instead that it had ended the contract in search of a test enabling “more equitable access” to the exam schools.

In October 2020, the Boston School Committee voted to cancel entrance exams for the city’s three exam schools in 2021, due to the COVID-19 pandemic. The School Committee opted for an admissions procedure under which 20% of the incoming class would be accepted based on top grades, and the other 80% based on grades and zip codes. Students coming from zip codes with lower-income communities would receive preferential treatment.

Boston Latin School has received backlash from some parents because of this decision. Opponents of the proposed admissions system created a Change.org petition, garnering almost 6,000 signatures. The petition, directed to Boston City Council, argued that cancelling the test would increase disruption due to the COVID-19 pandemic. A protest was held prior to the vote on the steps of Boston Latin School. One common concern surrounded Chinatown students potentially being excluded based on Chinatown’s surrounding area being rapidly gentrified, thus increasing the median income.

Curriculum
Declamation is one of the school's time-honored traditions. Students in the 7th through 10th grades are required to give an oration, known as declamation, in their English class three times during the year. The school also holds Public Declamation, in which students from all grades are welcomed to try out for the chance to declaim a memorized piece in front of an assembly. During Public Declamation, declaimers are scored on categories including "Memorization," "Presentation," and "Voice and Delivery," and those who score well in three of the first four public declamations are given the chance to declaim in front of alumni judges for awards in "Prize Declamation.”

In addition to declamation in English classes, the Modern Languages department holds an annual "World Language Declamation" competition. Once a year, during National Foreign Language Week (usually the first week of March), students in grades 8 through 12 perform orations in languages other than English. Entrants are categorized by level, rather than language. So all students declaiming at the first-year level of various languages are competing against each other, all students declaiming at the second-year level compete against each other, and so on.

In 2001, the school decided to decrease the Latin requirement by one year, starting with the class of 2006. For students admitted for 7th grade, the minimum number of years of Latin required decreased from five years to four years, and for students admitted for 9th grade, from four years to three years. Students, however, can still take Latin (and Greek) electives after their fourth year.

In a 1789 codicil to his will, Benjamin Franklin established a legacy to fund the Franklin Medals, which are awarded to the eight students with the highest grade-point averages at graduation.

Publications
There are currently three main publications of the Boston Latin School: The Register is the school's literary magazine, The Argo the school newspaper, and Catapulta is the school science magazine. George Santayana founded The Register in 1881 to serve as the school newspaper. Over the years, however, it evolved into a purely literary magazine, publishing prose and poetry written by members of the student body, as well as artwork. There are generally three editors-in-chief, and it is published twice per year. The Argo, the school's newspaper, is far younger, having been founded in 1970 after it was clear that the Register had become a purely literary magazine. As of the 2006–2007 school year, it is published seven times a year. Catapulta, the science magazine, highlights popular and recent science and technology and is generally published four times a year. The Register, the Argo, and Catapulta are entirely student-produced, and the "Argo" and the "Register" have won awards from the New England Scholastic Press Association, while Catapulta has won awards from the American Scholastic Press Association.

Another Boston Latin publication is "BLSA Bulletin", published by the Boston Latin School Association, whose president is Peter G. Kelly, '83.

Athletics

Boston Latin's teams are known as the Boston Latin Wolfpack; their colors are purple and white. Boston Latin has played rival Boston English in football every Thanksgiving since 1887, the oldest continuous high school rivalry in the United States.

The school has fielded several successful sports teams, including the fencing team, sailing team, cross country team, indoor and outdoor track teams, boys' and girls' volleyball team, the boys' and girls' crew teams, the boys' and girls' swimming and diving teams, baseball, softball, wrestling, boys' and girls' soccer, boys' and girls' hockey, and cheerleading.

However, the football team has not won its league or made the playoffs since 1987.

In the spring of 2014, Boston Latin launched its varsity boys' lacrosse as well as varsity girls' lacrosse, the only public school in Boston with lacrosse. In the spring of 2017, in just its third season as a varsity sport, the girls' lacrosse team made the state tournament for the first time.

Thanks to Angel Jin '13, Boston Latin was able to start its fencing club in 2011, working with the mayor as fencing blades were seen as weapons and could not be brought to school. Later, in the winter of 2015, Boston Latin launched its varsity boys' fencing as well as varsity girls' fencing, the only public school in Boston with fencing.

In the winter of the academic year 2015–16, the school's varsity fencing team took home the state championship title for the first time ever, with the men's team placing second overall and women's fourth overall. This title has continued on for women's fencing year after year until 2020. The men's fencing team made a comeback, placing second in the state championship this year, making BLS this year's unofficial state champion over-all.

In the spring of 2019, the school's boys' varsity volleyball team took home its first DCL championship title since 2006.

Performing and Fine Arts

Boston Latin's Arts Department offers courses as well as ensembles for its students to join.

The school offers Visual Art class and a Music Fundamental class for 7th graders as well as a Theatre class for 8th graders for students who are not enrolled in any other form of art. The department also offers higher-level Visual Art classes in the 11th and 12th grades and the option to take AP Art for students who demonstrate proficiency in this discipline. An additional Theatre Studies course can be taken in these grades as well, covering the history and styles of theatrics.

Latin School's Performing Arts provide opportunities for students from the 7th to 12th grade to learn and develop musical technique, as well as learn music theory in a classroom setting through AP Music Theory. The ensembles offered vary from beginner to high-level groups that compete at local and state competitions. Among the Performing Arts students have the option to participate in Chorus, Strings, Band, and Theatre (both in and out of school). The school's Wind Ensemble, Symphonic Band, Concert Strings Orchestra, and Concert Choir have received gold medals at MICCA competitions in the past. Extracurricular ensembles such as the Dues Band and Show Choir also compete for medals.

The Boston Latin School Big Band also competes in the Charles Mingus High School Jazz Festival, as well as the Essentially Ellington competition. Although they have not won the Ellington Competition, the band was one point off from being a Finalist in 2017. The band has been a Finalist in the Mingus Festival in 2017, 2018, 2019, and 2020, winning the Non-Specialized High School category in 2018.

In popular culture
 In "Six Meetings Before Lunch", a first-season episode of The West Wing, Rob Lowe's character Sam Seaborn mentioned Boston Latin School in a discussion of public school reform and school vouchers in American public education. He said, “Boston Latin, the oldest public school in America, is still the best secondary school in New England.” Mallory O'Brien replies "They all can't be Boston Latin and Bronx Science."
 On January 8, 2002, President George W. Bush visited the Boston Latin School after signing the No Child Left Behind Act earlier that day.
 In Season 1, Episode 12 of Studio 60 on the Sunset Strip, Matthew Perry's character Matt Albie mentioned that his nephew had a 3.8 GPA at Boston Latin.
 In the 2008–2009 school year, former vice president Al Gore visited Boston Latin School and commended the students for their hard work educating the community about making environmentally respectable decisions.

Alumni

Boston Latin has graduated notable Americans in the fields of politics (both local and national), religion, science, journalism, philosophy, and music. Of the 56 men who signed the Declaration of Independence, five were educated at Latin: Adams, Franklin, Hancock, Hooper, and Paine. Graduates and students fought in the Revolutionary War, American Civil War, World War I, World War II, Korean War, and the Vietnam War, and plaques and statues in the school building honor those who died.

Hall of Fame
The Hall of Fame, known casually as "The Wall," refers to the upper frieze in the school's auditorium, where the last names of famous alumni are painted. These names include Adams, Bernstein, Fitzgerald, Franklin, Hancock, Hooper, John Hull, Kennedy, Mather, Paine, Quincy, Santayana, Winthrop, Nicolas Hyacinthe, and many others. The most recent name, Wade McCree Jr., was added to the frieze in 1999, and the selection of the name involved a conscious effort to choose a graduate of color. There are no names of female graduates, mostly because women have attended the school for just 46 years and the honor is only bestowed posthumously. There is also a lower frieze with the names of many other distinguished graduates, and a place on the lower frieze can be awarded while the person is still alive.

Rankings and awards
In 2007, the school was named one of the top 20 high schools in the United States by U.S. News & World Report magazine. It was named a 2011 "Blue Ribbon School of Excellence", the Department of Education's highest award. As of 2018, it is listed under the "gold medal" list, ranking 48 out of the top 100 high schools in the United States by U.S. News & World Report.

In 2019, the school was rated the school as the top high school in the Boston area by U.S. News & World Report and number 33 in national rankings.

See also

 John D. O'Bryant School of Mathematics & Science
 Roxbury Latin School
 Brooklyn Latin School
 List of the oldest public high schools in the United States

References

External links

 
 Catalogue of the Boston Public Latin School, Established in 1635: With an Historical Sketch, Henry Fitch Jenks (1886)

1635 establishments in Massachusetts
Educational institutions established in the 1630s
High schools in Boston
Middle schools in Boston
Public high schools in Massachusetts